Pennsylvania State Senate District 37 includes part of Allegheny County. It is currently represented by Republican Devlin Robinson.

District profile
The district includes the following areas:

Senators

Recent election results

References

Pennsylvania Senate districts
Government of Allegheny County, Pennsylvania
Government of Washington County, Pennsylvania